Durango Rugby Taldea is a Spanish rugby team based in Durango.

History
The club was founded in 1986.

Season to season

11 seasons in División de Honor B

External links
Official website

Rugby clubs established in 1986
Rugby union teams in the Basque Country (autonomous community)
1986 establishments in Spain
Sport in Biscay